Alain Berliner (born 21 February 1963) is a Belgian film director best known for the 1997 film Ma vie en rose, which won the Golden Globe Award for Best Foreign Language Film at the 55th Golden Globe Awards in 1998.

Born in Brussels, he also directed Le Mur, Passion of Mind, La Maison du canal, and J'aurais voulu être un danseur.

References

External links

Alain Berliner official site (English version)

1963 births
Living people
Belgian film directors
European Film Award for Best Screenwriter winners